David Newsham (born 7 July 1967) is a British auto racing driver and businessman. He is the managing director of Norscott Vending. He raced in the British Touring Car Championship from 2011 to 2017, but in 2016, he competed in the British Rallycross Championship, only entering two rounds of the BTCC in place of Kelvin Fletcher.

He announced his retirement from the BTCC on 9 January 2018.

Racing career

Renault Clio Cup UK
Born in Carmarthen, Newsham joined the TOCA tour in 2008, competing in the final two rounds of the Renault Clio Cup UK. This led to a full season in 2009, driving for Amery Motorsport. He scored one race win at Silverstone and finished fifth on points at the end of the season. In 2010, he switched to Team Pyro and dominated the series, winning the championship title with twelve race wins.

British Touring Car Championship

Geoff Steel Racing and STR (2011)
In 2011, Newsham stepped up to the British Touring Car Championship. Newsham started the season driving for Geoff Steel Racing, with a Super 2000 BMW 320si. He scored a point in his first race at Brands Hatch, but a disappointing weekend at Donington Park which included two retirements prompted him to leave the team.

After leaving Geoff Steel Racing, Newsham drove a NGTC SEAT León for Special Tuning Racing. In his first race for the team at Oulton Park, he set the fastest lap and scored points in race three. He started on pole position for the reversed grid race at Snetterton but fell down the order to 8th at the end after taking wheel damage. He finished the season 15th in the Drivers Championship, four places down on his teammate despite having missed the round at Thruxton.

Team ES Racing (2012)
In 2012, Newsham switched to an ex-Triple Eight Race Engineering S2000 spec Vauxhall Vectra run by Team ES Racing. He achieved his first pole position at Brands Hatch at the start of the season, setting his time during the middle of the session and stayed at the top of the timesheet. He was in contention for the win in race 1 until Jason Plato made contact with him and he retired. He took a third place podium finish in the final race of the day. He scored his second best result of the season at Thruxton when he finished second in the first race. Newsham won his first BTCC race in the third race at Snetterton, and added to his race wins with a lights to flag victory in the third race at Knockhill, his 'local' circuit. He secured his sixth podium of the season at Silverstone in the second race, having already finished second in the first race of the day. Newsham finished the season 9th in the drivers' standings and 6th in the Independents' Trophy. To crown a first full competitive season in the BTCC, Newsham received the official BTCC fans' Driver of the Year award.

Speedworks Motorsport (2013)
Newsham tested for Speedworks Motorsport at Donington Park on 29 November 2012. On 20 December, it was confirmed that he would join the team for the 2013 season. He finished 10th in the standings.

AmD (2014)
Dave Newsham signed up with AmD and drove their NGTC Ford Focus for the 2014 campaign, finishing 17th overall with a best result of 2nd.

Power Maxed Racing (2015–2016)
Dave Newsham signed for Power Maxed Racing in 2015 and drove their Chevrolet Cruze. He achieved a pair of 4th place finishes during the year and finished 16th in the championship standings.

Unable to secure the budget for Touring Cars in 2016, Dave ventured into the British Rallycross Championship, again driving for Power Maxed Racing. Halfway through the season, he was recalled to their Touring Car programme for two rounds only to fill in for Kelvin Fletcher. He managed a 7th place at his home race at Knockhill and 9th at Rockingham. He placed 22nd in the standings.

BTC Norlin Racing (2017)

Newsham signed for BTC Norlin Racing in 2017, again driving the Chevrolet Cruze. He placed 14th in the standings.

Racing record

Complete British Touring Car Championship results
(key) (Races in bold indicate pole position – 1 point awarded in first race) (Races in italics indicate fastest lap – 1 point awarded all races) (* signifies that driver lead race for at least one lap – 1 point given all races)

Sponsors
Clarke Energy
Dijitul
Coffee Drops
Vendman

References

External links
BTCC official site
Norscott Vending
Dave Newsham Racing

Living people
Scottish racing drivers
1967 births
British Touring Car Championship drivers
Ginetta GT4 Supercup drivers
Renault UK Clio Cup drivers
Mini Challenge UK drivers